Love Potion No. 9 is a 1992 American romantic comedy film starring Tate Donovan and Sandra Bullock. The film takes its name from the 1959 hit song, "Love Potion No. 9". The story is about a love potion, that enables a person to make people of the opposite sex become completely infatuated with them by simply talking.

Plot
Paul Matthews is a lonely biochemist with a crush on his unavailable co-worker, biologist Diane Farrow. His friends take him to a gypsy on 34th and Vine named Madame Ruth. After reading his palm and seeing absolutely no romance in his life, Ruth gives him a small amount of Love Potion No. 8 on a piece of paper. As a scientist, Paul has doubts and ends up throwing it in the trash when he gets home. Around this time, Paul's friends buy him the services of Marisa, but all they do is talk.

His cat gets into the trash and eats some of the potion, then meows and attracts all the other cats in the neighborhood. When Paul sees the results, he takes it to Diane, and they find out the "scientific" properties of it. After analyzing it, they decide to use themselves as human test subjects. Diane ends up attracting an Italian car mogul and the prince of England, ending up getting a makeover in the process, while Paul has a string of hookups with women in bars, supermarkets, cars, sorority houses.

Paul and Diane realize their romantic attraction to each other and become involved. Eventually, Paul plans a proposal to Diane; however, when he comes by her house to do so, she's not there. Later, she tells him she has fallen for Gary. Paul is devastated and decides he really wants to get her back.
Marisa comes to his house to steal his stereo, and after trying the potion in his bathroom, she makes Paul gladly give her all his valuables, including the potion.

After "waking up" from his infatuation, Paul gets an idea, and Madame Ruth confirms that somebody looking like Gary has bought all the potion No. 8. He phones Diane to tell her Gary is using the potion on her, but Gary forbids her to talk to him. After weeks of unsuccessful attempts, Paul goes back to Madame Ruth, who gives him Love Potion No. 9, which will not create love, but remove things obscuring it (such as potion No. 8). But if Diane was never really in love with him, Paul will love her for his entire life and she will eternally hate him.

Paul asks three friends to help him force Diane to take No. 9, but they can't believe him. Marisa arrives at the house and uses No. 8 to rob all of them, proving the power of the potion.
When they arrive at the house, Diane's friend and matron of honor tells them Diane and Gary are marrying in an hour, but that she suspects something is wrong with Diane. Paul explains, she agrees to give Diane the potion, and things go terribly wrong, but Marisa, having tricked Gary's potion bottle from him, causes havoc and effectively ends the wedding, which gives Paul the chance to drink Potion No. 9, kiss Diane and wait five minutes as per the instructions. The effect kicks in too late but in the end, Diane runs away from Gary into Paul's arms.

Note
The film gives a pseudoscientific explanation as to how Love Potion No. 8 "works." It is explained:

When swallowed it affects the vocal cords directly so that when you speak micro-tremors encoded within your voice stimulate tiny little hairs in the inner ear of the opposite sex. The hair vibrates, sending a signal along a nerve to the brain, which in turn produces a combination of mood-altering, endogenous chemicals responsible for the biochemical process of falling in love. It makes members of the same sex hostile. It only works for four hours at a time.

Love Potion No. 9 prevents love from fading, and overrides the effects of Love Potion No. 8.

Cast
 Tate Donovan as Paul Matthews
 Sandra Bullock as Diane Farrow
 Mary Mara as Marisa
 Dale Midkiff as Gary Logan
 Hillary B. Smith as Sally
 Anne Bancroft as Madame Ruth
 Dylan Baker as Prince Geoffrey
 Blake Clark as Motorcycle Cop
 Bruce McCarty as Jeff
 Rebecca Staab as Cheryl
 Adrian Paul as Enrico Pazzoli 
 Ric Reitz as Dave

Reception
On Rotten Tomatoes the film has an approval rating of 25% based on reviews from 12 critics.

Emanuel Levy of Variety called it "a light-hearted one-joke romantic comedy" and that it "tries too hard to be cute. Glib humor and emphasis on "feel good" values aim squarely at the dating crowd and twenty-something couples. But lack of real wit and comic vitality, absence of star names and sluggish pace make pic less appealing than it might have been."
Entertainment Weekly gave the film a "D" grade.

The film opened in 278 theaters and earned $416,641 in its opening weekend, and its North American domestic total was $754,935.

References

External links 
 
 

1992 films
1992 romantic comedy films
American fantasy comedy films
American romantic comedy films
American romantic fantasy films
American sex comedy films
1990s English-language films
Films about potions
Films based on songs
Films set in Georgia (U.S. state)
20th Century Fox films
Films with screenplays by Dale Launer
Films scored by Ennio Morricone
1990s sex comedy films
1992 directorial debut films
1990s American films